Tanjug (/'tʌnjʊg/) (sometimes stylized as TANJUG) was a Serbian state news agency based in Belgrade, which officially ceased to exist in March 2021. Since then, Belgrade based private company Tanjug Tačno, acquired the rights to use the intellectual property rights and trademarks of the former agency.

History

Founded on 5 November 1943 as Yugoslavia's official news agency, its name is an acronym of its full original native name  Telegrafska agencija nove Jugoslavije ("Telegraphic Agency of New Yugoslavia").

From 1975 to the mid-1980s, Tanjug had a leading role in the Non-Aligned News Agencies Pool (NANAP), a collaborating group of news agencies of the Non-Aligned Movement (NAM). Tanjug professionals helped equip and train journalists and technicians of state media in other NAM countries, mainly in Africa and South Asia.

On 31 October 2015, according to media reports, Tanjug ceased its operations due to financial problems. Soon after, state secretary in the Ministry of Culture and Information eventually dispelled these rumors, but acknowledged the difficulties and said a public–private partnership could be the solution to the problem. However, the agency continued working, signed contracts with state bodies and won various public tenders and other jobs related to news agencies. Also, since then most of its former employees are working on part-time contracts and have not guaranteed working rights.

On 9 March 2021, Tanjug officially ceased to exist. Since then, Belgrade based private company Tanjug Tačno, owned by "Minacord media" (majority owner being Željko Joksimović) and "Radiotelevizija Pančevo", acquired the 10-year rights to use the intellectual property rights and trademarks of the agency.

See also
 Media agencies in Serbia

References

External links

1943 establishments in Serbia
Companies based in Belgrade
Government-owned companies of Serbia
Mass media companies established in 1943
Mass media in Belgrade
News agencies based in Serbia